Hadera attack may refer to:

 Hadera bus station suicide bombing, in 1994
 Bat Mitzvah massacre, in 2002
 Hadera Market bombing, in 2005
 2022 Hadera shooting

Disambig-Class Israel-related articles